Misaeri Kitemaggwa Kauma (15 August 1929 – 7 October 1997). was an Anglican Bishop in Uganda.

Kauma was born at Namagoma, educated at Uganda Christian University and ordained in 1967. A former teacher, 
he was consecrated the Assistant Bishop of Namirembe in 1975.

References 

1929 births
1997 deaths
20th-century Anglican bishops in Uganda
Uganda Christian University alumni
Ugandan educators
Anglican bishops of Namirembe